Bowling took place for the men's and women's individual, doubles, trios, and team events at the 2006 Asian Games in Doha, Qatar from December 3 to December 10. All events were held at the Qatar Bowling Center.

Schedule

Medalists

Men

Women

Medal table

Participating nations
A total of 191 athletes from 20 nations competed in bowling at the 2006 Asian Games:

References

 Results at ABF Website

External links
Official Website

 
2006 Asian Games events
2006
Asian Games
2006 Asian Games